Paranillus is a genus of ground beetles in the family Carabidae. There are about 13 described species in Paranillus.

Species
These 13 species belong to the genus Paranillus:

 Paranillus banari Giachino, 2015  (Madagascar)
 Paranillus elongatus Jeannel, 1963  (Madagascar)
 Paranillus insularis Giachino, 2008  (Seychelles)
 Paranillus janaki Giachino, 2008  (Madagascar)
 Paranillus latipennis Jeannel, 1958  (Madagascar)
 Paranillus longulus Jeannel, 1957  (Madagascar)
 Paranillus madecassus Giachino, 2015  (Madagascar)
 Paranillus milloti Jeannel, 1949  (Madagascar)
 Paranillus pauliani Jeannel, 1957  (Madagascar)
 Paranillus pavesii Giachino, 2008  (Madagascar)
 Paranillus punctatostriatus Jeannel, 1963  (Madagascar)
 Paranillus scapularis Jeannel, 1957  (Madagascar)
 Paranillus sogai Jeannel, 1963  (Madagascar)

References

Trechinae